Gualterus Anglicus (Medieval Latin for Walter the Englishman) was an Anglo-Norman poet and scribe who produced a seminal version of Aesop's Fables (in distichs) around the year 1175.

Identification of the author

This author was earlier called the Anonymus Neveleti, referring to attribution in the seventeenth-century Mythologia Aesopica of Isaac Nicholas Nevelet. The name Walter (Latin Gualterus) was produced by Léopold Hervieux, on the basis of manuscript evidence, and he went on to identify the author as Walter of the Mill, archbishop of Palermo from 1168 onwards. Scholars have disputed this second step of identification; it may no longer be supported. The entire attribution is attacked.

The collection and its influence

This collection of 62 fables is more accurately called the verse Romulus, or elegiac Romulus (from its elegiac couplets). Given the uncertainty over the authorship, these terms are used in scholarly works.

There is an earlier prose version of Romulus, also; it has been dated as early as the tenth century, or the sixth century. It is adapted from Phaedrus; the initial fable "The Cock and the Jewel", supposedly the reply of Phaedrus to his critics, marks out fable collections originating from this source. Walter changed the "jewel" from a pearl to jasper.

The verse Romulus formed the mainstream versions of medieval 'Aesop'. It is thought to be the version used by Dante.

When John Lydgate produced Isopes Fabules, the first fable collection written in English, the verse Romulus was a major source. Particularly sophisticated use of this fable tradition is made later in the 15th century in Robert Henryson's Morall Fabillis, written in Scots.

Early printed editions appeared under the title Aesopus moralisatus, around 1500.

References
Julia Bastin (editor) (1929–30), Recueil général des Isopets (two volumes)
Sandro Boldrini (1994), Uomini e bestie: le favole dell Aesopus latinus
Aaron E. Wright (editor) (1997), The Fables of "Walter of England", Edited from Wolfenbüttel, Herzog August Bibliothek, Codex Guelferbytanus 185 Helmstadiensis
Paola Busdraghi (editor) (2005), L'Esopus. attribuito a Gualtiero Anglico
 Rebekka Nöcker: Volkssprachiges Proverbium in der Gelehrtenkultur : ein lateinischer Fabelkommentar des 15. Jahrhunderts mit deutschen Reimpaarepimythien; Untersuchung und Edition, Berlin [u.a.] : De Gruyter, 2015,

Notes

External links
mythfolklore.net online texts
Alim online texts
 Arlima page

12th-century English people
12th-century English poets
English male poets
12th-century English writers
12th-century Latin writers